The women's 3000 metre at the 2011 World Short Track Speed Skating Championships took place March 13, 2011 at the Sheffield Arena.

Results

Final

References

2011 World Short Track Speed Skating Championships